Crotaphytus dickersonae, also known commonly as Dickerson's collared lizard, the Mexican collared lizard, the Sonoran collared lizard, and el cachurón de azul de collar in Spanish, is a species of lizard in the family Crotaphytidae. The species is endemic to Mexico.

Etymology
The specific name, dickersonae, is in honor of American herpetologist Mary Cynthia Dickerson.

Geographic range
C. dickersonae is found in the Mexican state of Sonora, not only on the coastline but also on Tiburón Island in the Gulf of California.

Habitat
The preferred natural habitats of C. dickersonae are shrubland and rocky areas.

Reproduction
C. dickersonae is oviparous.

References

Further reading
Faber, Lieke; Plasman, Melissa; Duchateau, Marie José (2013). "The use of photo identification on Dickerson's collared lizard (Crotaphytus dickersonae)". Herpetological Review 44 (4): 600–603.
Montanucci RR, Axtell RW, Dessauer HC (1975). "Evolutionary Divergence among Collared Lizards (Crotaphytus), with Comments on the Status of Gambelia". Herpetologica 31 (3): 336–347. 
Schmidt KP (1922). "The Amphibians and Reptiles of Lower California and the Neighboring Islands". Bulletin of the American Museum of Natural History 46: 607–707 + Plates XLVII–LVII. (Crotaphytus dickersonae, new species, pp. 638–639, Figure 2).

Crotaphytus
Reptiles described in 1922
Taxa named by Karl Patterson Schmidt
Reptiles of Mexico